Lee Oakes (born 1976) is an English actor best known for his role as Munch Wilkinson in the British comedy Two Pints of Lager and a Packet of Crisps and as Kev in the British television series After You've Gone, a friend and fellow builder of Jimmy Venables.

Oakes is originally from Haslington near Crewe in Cheshire, North West England. He attended Sandbach School for Boys. Oakes was also a member of the Chester Gateway Youth Theatre.

Lee developed his talents at the BBC whilst pursuing his theatrical career, most notably in the highly acclaimed Once Upon a Time in Wigan, Sparkleshark at the National.

Oakes has appeared in DragonHeart, Daylight, Casualty, Holby City, The Bill, Coronation Street, Heartbeat, Emmerdale and Blue Murder. In 2009, he appeared in the British crime thriller Harry Brown playing Dean.

In 2012, Oakes appeared in Hadouken!'s video "Parasite".

After retiring from acting he worked as MHE driver for Ceva logistics before moving onto agency work for Bentley

References

External links

1974 births
English male television actors
Living people